This is a list of properties and districts in Glynn County, Georgia that are listed on the National Register of Historic Places (NRHP).

Current listings

|}

References

Glynn
Buildings and structures in Glynn County, Georgia